"Rock and Roll (I Gave You the Best Years of My Life)" is a 1973 song written and originally performed by Australian singer Kevin Johnson, most famously covered by American singer Mac Davis.

Johnson's version reached number four in Australia.  The guitar solo in Johnson's version was played by Rory O'Donoghue.In Australia, Ireland and Great Britain, it was only Johnson's original version which charted.

Mac Davis cover
In the United States it was Mac Davis who had the primary hit version in 1974, although three versions of the song became American chart hits.  His version reached #15 on the Billboard Hot 100.  "Rock 'N' Roll" is the first track on his sixth studio album All the Love in the World.  The song was the lead single of two issued from the LP, the other being the title track, and both of which became hit records.

The Cats version
The Dutch band The Cats released a version in the Netherlands in 1973 on EMI Nederland. The song made to #3 on the Dutch charts Single Top 100 and Dutch Top 40.

Terry Jacks version
In Canada, Terry Jacks got it into the charts in 1975. It also made it to number 97 on Billboard Hot 100. His version appeared in Y' Don't Fight the Sea and was a bonus song appearing in his 1974 album Seasons in the Sun.

Other versions of Rock and Roll (I Gave You the Best Years of My Life)
New Zealand's very popular singer Craig Scott covered the song in 1974, reaching #13.

In 1977, Gary Glitter recorded a version on his album Silver Star. (His version is now banned from radio airplay)

Over the years there have been recorded versions by other artists, these include Albert West, Digby Richards, and Samuel Neely.

In 1973, Joe Dassin recorded Les plus belles années de ma vie (The best years of my life), a French cover.

In 1976, Brimkló recorded an Icelandic cover, called Rock'n Roll, Öll Mín Bestu Ár (Rock'n Roll, All My Best Years).

Chart history

Weekly charts
Kevin Johnson original

The Cats cover

Craig Scott cover

Terry Jacks cover

Year-end charts

Mac Davis cover

References

External links
  
 
  
 

1973 songs
1973 singles
1974 singles
Mac Davis songs
Craig Scott songs
Doug Kershaw songs
Songs about rock music
Songs about guitars
Columbia Records singles
Bell Records singles